The 2008 Wilkes-Barre/Scranton Pioneers season is the team's seventh season.  The Pioneers attempted to return to the ArenaCup after falling to the Tulsa Talons in ArenaCup VIII, the team's first championship appearance.

Rosters

Training camp

Week 1

Final roster

Team staff

Schedule

Regular season

Postseason

Final standings

Attendance

External links
ArenaFan Online 2008 Wilkes-Barre/Scranton Pioneers schedule
ArenaFan Online 2008 af2 standings
ArenaFan Online 2008 af2 attendance

Wilkes-Barre/Scranton Pioneers seasons
Wilkes-Barre Scranton Pioneers
2008 in American football